The Moldova State University (USM; Romanian: Universitatea de Stat din Moldova) is a university located in Chișinău, Moldova.

History

The university was founded on 1 October 1946. Initially, it had 320 students enrolled in 5 faculties, Physics and Mathematics, Geology and Pedology, History and Philology, Biology, Chemistry. Within the 12 departments there were 35 teachers. Among the initiators of the founding of the university were Macarie Radu and Mihail Pavlov.

In 1969, the State University of Moldova joined the International Association of Universities as a plenipotentiary member. The prestige of the State University of Moldova on the international arena has been strengthened by the 14 scientists and cultures of 9 countries of the world who have been awarded the title of Doctor Honoris Causa of the State University of Moldova. The State University of Moldova has concluded more than 60 cooperation agreements in the field of education and science with university centers in 25 countries. At this university they have done their  studies students from about 80 countries of the world.

Organization
The university is organized into faculties:

 Biology and Pedology
 Chemistry and Chemical Technology
 Law
 Physics
 History and Philosophy
 Journalism and Communication Sciences
 Foreign Languages and Literature
 Letters
 Mathematics and Computer Science
 Psychology and Education Sciences
 International Relations, Political and Administrative Sciences
 Sociology and Social Assistance
 Economics

See also
 List of universities in Moldova
 Education in Moldova

References

External links

 
Buildings and structures in Chișinău
Educational institutions established in 1946
1946 establishments in the Soviet Union